Live for Today may refer to:
 Live for Today (EP), a 2002 EP by Boysetsfire
 "Live for Today" (song), a 1981 song by Toto 
 "Live for Today", a song by 3 Doors Down from Seventeen Days
 "Live for Today", a song by Ratt from Ratt
 "Live for Today", a song by Sweet from Off the Record
 "Live for Today", a song by Zion I from Break a Dawn

See also
 Let's Live for Today (disambiguation)
 Carpe diem
 Hedonism
 YOLO (aphorism)